The Bootleg Series Vol. 16: Springtime in New York 1980–1985 is a compilation album by American singer-songwriter Bob Dylan. The 16th installment in the ongoing Bob Dylan Bootleg Series, it was released by Legacy Records on September 17, 2021. The compilation includes tour rehearsals, and outtakes from Shot of Love, Infidels, and Empire Burlesque. The release comes in a two-CD standard edition and a five-disc deluxe edition. In addition to the CD releases, a 2-LP and 4-LP were released, with the latter coming from Third Man Records.

Track listing 
All tracks are written by Bob Dylan unless otherwise mentioned.

Standard edition

Deluxe 5-CD edition

Charts

References 

2021 compilation albums
Bob Dylan compilation albums
Columbia Records compilation albums